Gene Mayer and Henry Pfister were the defending champions but only Gene Mayer competed that year.

Gene Mayer teamed up with his brother Sandy Mayer and successfully defended his title by defeating Ross Case and Phil Dent 6–4, 6–4, 6–4 in the final.

Seeds

Draw

Finals

Top half

Section 1

Section 2

Bottom half

Section 3

Section 4

References

External links
1979 French Open – Men's draws and results at the International Tennis Federation

Men's Doubles
French Open by year – Men's doubles